This is a list of seasons completed by the Bradley Braves men's college basketball team.

Seasons

References

 
Bradley Braves
Bradley Braves basketball seasons